Blagoy Paskov (born 2 March 1991, in Sofia) is a Bulgarian footballer, currently playing for Pirin Gotse Delchev as a striker.

References

External links

1991 births
Living people
Bulgarian footballers
Bulgaria youth international footballers
First Professional Football League (Bulgaria) players
PFC CSKA Sofia players
OFC Bdin Vidin players
PFC Pirin Blagoevgrad players
FC Chavdar Etropole players
PFC Svetkavitsa players
PFC Spartak Varna players
PFC Pirin Gotse Delchev players
Footballers from Sofia
Association football forwards